The Risale-i Nur Collection is a tafsir (exegesis) on the Qur'an written by Said Nursî, an Islamic Scholar from Bitlis region of Turkey between the 1910s and 1950s. The commentary does not keep to the order of the ayah as is done in classic Islamic exegesis, as it makes comments on their meanings. It is rather a thematic tafsir which deals with the doubts surrounding the basic doctrines and principles of Islam. The collection includes fourteen books.

The primary purpose of the Risale-i Nur is to bring about a religious revival in Turkey.

The collection includes an analysis of Islamic sources and a reinterpretation of the text for the "mentality" of Said Nursi's age. However, it is not solely an exegesis, as it includes reflections and details about Said Nursi's own life and interpretations. These reflections and details help the reader to learn how to practice everyday activities on Qur'an norms, and "install" Qur'an to a person's alternating life situations and emotions.

Distinctive features of the collection
With these writings, Said Nursî opened up a new, direct way to reality (haqiqat) and knowledge of God which he described as the highway of the Qur'an and way of the companions of Muhammad through the "legacy of prophethood", which gains for those who follow it "true and certain belief". Said Nursi did not ascribe the writings to himself, but claimed that they "proceeded from the Qur'an itself" like "rays shining out of from [its] truths".

Thus, rather than being a Qur'anic commentary which expounds all its verses giving the immediate reasons for their revelation and the apparent meanings of the words and sentences, the Risale-i Nur is what is known as a mânevî tefsir, or commentary which expounds the meaning of the Qur'anic truths. For there are various sorts of commentaries. The verses mostly expounded in the Risale-i Nur are those concerned with the truths of belief, such as the Divine Names and attributes and the Divine activity in the universe, the Divine existence and Oneness, resurrection, prophethood, Divine Determining or destiny, and man's duties of worship. Nursî explains how the Qur'an addresses all men in every age in accordance with the degree of their understanding and development; it has a face that looks to each age. The Risale-i Nur, then, explains that face of the Qur'an which looks to this age. We shall now look at further aspects of the Risale-i Nur related to this point.

According to Nursî, the Qur'an invites man to observe the universe and reflect on the Divine activity within it; following just this method, Nursî claims proofs and explanations for the truths of belief. He likens the universe to a book, and looking at it in the way shown by the Qur'an, that is, 'reading' it for its meaning, learns of the Divine Names and attributes and other truths of belief. The book's purpose is to describe its Author and Maker; beings become evidences and signs to their Creator. Thus, an important element in the way of the Risale-i Nur is reflection or contemplation (tefekkür), 'reading' the Book of the Universe in order to increase in knowledge of God and to obtain 'true and certain belief' in all the truths of belief.
Nursî demonstrates the fundamentals of Islam, such as Divine Oneness, arrived at in this way are the only rational and logical explanation of the universe, and making comparisons with Naturalist and Materialist philosophy which have used science's findings about the universe to deny those truths, show the concepts on which they are based, such as causality and Nature, to be irrational and logically absurd.
Indeed, far from contradicting them, in uncovering the order and working of the universe, science broadens and deepens knowledge of the truths of belief.

In the Risale-i Nur many descriptions of the Divine activity in the universe are looked at through the eyes of science, and reflect Nursî's knowledge of it. The Risale-i Nur shows that there is no contradiction or conflict between religion and science.
In addition, all these matters discussed in the Risale-i Nur are set out as reasoned arguments and proved according to logic. All the most important of the truths of belief are proved so that even unbelievers can see their necessity. And so too, inspired by the Qur'an, even the most profound and inaccessible truths are made accessible by means of comparisons, which bring them close to the understanding like telescopes, so that they are readily understandable by ordinary people and those with no previous knowledge of these questions.
Another aspect of the Risale-i Nur related to the face of the Qur'an which looks to this age, is that it explains everything from the point of view of wisdom; that is, as is mentioned again below, it explains the purpose of everything. It considers things from the point of view of the Divine Name of All-Wise.

Also, following this method, in the Risale-i Nur, Nursî dealt with many mysteries of religion, such as bodily resurrection and Divine Determining and man's will, and the riddle of the constant activity in the universe and the motion of particles, before which man relying on his own intellect and philosophy had been impotent.

History
While in Barla, Nursî put the treatise on Resurrection and the pieces that followed it together in the form of a collection and gave it the name of Sozler (The Words). The Words was followed by Mektûbat (Letters), a collection of thirty-three letters of varying lengths from Nursî to his students. And this was followed by Lem'alar (The Flashes Collection), and Sualar (The Rays), which was completed in 1949. Together with these are the three collections of Additional Letters, for each of Nursî's main places of exile, Barla Lahikasi, Kastamonu Lahikasi, and Emirdag Lahikasi.
The way the Risale-i Nur was written and disseminated was unique, like the work itself. Nursî would dictate at speed to a scribe, who would write down the piece in question with equal speed; the actual writing was very quick. Nursî had no books for reference and the writing of religious works was of course forbidden. They were all written therefore in the mountains and out in the countryside. Handwritten copies were then made, these were secretly copied out in the houses of the Risale-i Nur 'students', as they were called, and passed from village to village, and then from town to town, until they spread throughout Turkey. Only in 1946 were Risale-i Nur students able to obtain duplicating machines, while it was not till 1956 that various parts were printed on modern presses in the new, Latin, script. The figure given for hand-written copies is 600,000.
It may be seen from the above figure how the Risale-i Nur Movement spread within Turkey, despite all efforts to stop it. After 1950, the period of what Nursî called 'the Third Said', there was a great increase in the number of students, particularly among the young and those who had been through the secular education system of the Republic. At the same time the number of students outside Turkey increased.

Main volumes (translated into English)

The Words (Sözler)
The Words is the first volume of the Risale-i Nur and consist of thirty-three independent parts or ‘Words’, which explain and prove the fundamentals of Belief, including its myriad virtues and advantages. Included here are exposition of the Divine Names and Attributes  in creation, the resurrection of the dead and the Hereafter, Prophethood and the Ascension, the Miraculousness of the Qur'an, the angels, the immortality of man's soul, Divine Determining (fate or destiny), together with cogent discussion on the true nature of man and the universe, The wisdom of the specified times of the five daily prayers, and man's fundamental and innate need to worship Allah.
Each subject is explained with comparisons and allegories, and demonstrated with reasoned arguments and logical proofs. The most profound aspects of the truths of Iman, are explained in a way that everyone can understand easily.
This work responds to the attacks against the Qur'an in the name of science and philosophy, and demonstrates the rationality of belief in Allah. It shows beyond any reasonable doubt that man's happiness and success both in this world and the next only lie in belief in Allah and knowledge of Allah.

The Letters (Mektûbat)
This second volume of the Risale-i Nur demonstrates the special relationship between Nursî and his students. In this Collection, Said Nursi replied to numerous and diverse questions posed by the students. Therefore, the Letters cover a lot of different subjects. For example, how death is a bounty; where Hell is situated; (The Letters 2004, p. 21-29). how the metaphorical love for individuals or for this world can be transformed into true love; (The Letters 2004, p. 28) explanation of where the Great Gathering and Last Judgement will take place; (The Letters 2004, p. 57) a letter of condolence on the death of a child;The Letters 2004, p. 100) the proof for prophethood of Muhammad; (The Letters 2004, p. 236) calling upon children to be kind to their parents; (The Letters 2004, p. 308) calling upon believers to brotherhood and love and pointing out effective ways of preventing enmity against a believer; (The Letters 2004, p. 311) the best way in which believers can pray for each other; (The Letters 2004, p. 330) the importance of supplication (The Letters 2004, p. 353) and the numerous Qur'anic commands to offer thanks; (The Letters 2004, p. 428) the reality and benefits of true dreams. (The Letters 2004, p. 407)
Moreover, The Letters provide helpful answers to many questions of Belief and Islam; they contain unique explanations of the truths of Iman and the mysteries of the Qur'an which also illustrate the Qur'anic way of Knowledge of Allah manifested by the Risale-i Nur. For instance, Said Nursi explained some of the instances of wisdom in the fast of the blessed month of Ramadan (The Letters 2004, p. 466) and he offers important guidance to contemporary Muslims concerning issues ranging from nationalism (The Letters 2004, p. 379, 491) to Sufism. (The Letters 2004, p. 518) This collection includes the famous Nineteenth Letter which describes more than three hundred of the miracles of Muhammad. Even though this letter includes many hadiths and is more than a hundred pages in length based on traditions and narrations, it was written completely from memory without referring to any book “in a few days by working two or three hours every day, for a total of twelve hours”. (The Letters 2004, p. 116) The Letters also shed light on Nursî's own life in his numerous years of exile and the conditions during the early years of the Turkish Republic. (The Letters 2004, p. 83)

The Flashes (Lem'alar)
The Flashes Collection starts with 2 very poignant supplications- the famous supplication of the prophet Yunus showing its relevance for everyone today; and the famous supplication of the prophet Ayub providing a true remedy for all those who are afflicted by disaster. Like the first two volumes this Collection deals very compellingly with a number of diverse subjects. The primary purpose of the topics is aimed at expounding the various Qur'anic verses and its teachings concerning the fundamentals of Belief in a way that addresses modern man's understanding and is relevant to his needs.
Some of the subjects discussed include seven predictions concerning the Unseen in the three final verses of Surah al-Fath; "The highway of the practices of the Prophet and antidote for the sickness of innovations"; the meaning of the phrase "I seek refuge from Satan the
Accursed"; the reality of those things that captivate the human soul, and through severing attachment to them turns man's face to eternity; the Qur'anic principle of humility;
Allah has included in all activity and striving a reward and pleasure; a supplication that illustrates the meaning of the Hadith "Die before you die"; On Frugality; On Sincerity- including the four rules for gaining and preserving sincerity; On Nature; Four instances of wisdom of the Qur'anic injunction about the veiling of women, and a compelling and convincing discussion detailing the ways in which happiness of women in both worlds may be preserved by adhering to Islamic principles and practices; Message for the Sick; Treatise for the Elderly; On the Six Divine Names of Allah bearing the Greatest Name.

The Rays (Şuâlar)
The Rays Collection contains some of the key sections of the Risale-i Nur. Among these are: The Supreme Sign, which describes the testimony articulated by all the realms of creation to Allah's Necessary Existence and Oneness, is an expression of the reflective thought which is the foundational basis of the way of the Risale-i Nur. Further explanations and proofs of Divine Oneness, based also on recognizing and 'reading' the manifestations of Allah in the universe are set out in the Second, Third, and Fourth Rays in this book. While in addition to these questions (i) The Fruits of Belief - One hour per day is sufficient for the five obligatory prayers; The truth of death; true, pain-free pleasure is found only in belief in Allah, and is possible only through such Belief; A number of benefits of believing in the Hereafter which look to man's individual and social life; A reply to objections raised about repetitions in the Qur'an; The fruits tasted in this world of belief in the angels. and (ii) The Shining Proof-Seeking knowledge of the Creator through His Attributes, knowledge, will and power put forward clear, proofs of the main 'pillars of belief'. Also included in this volume are parts of Nursî's defense speeches in the Courts of Denizli and Afyon, and the short letters and notes he wrote to his fellow-prisoners (his students) while incarcerated. As well as advising them about their defenses and directing the continuing work of the Risale-i Nur, essentially these letters were written to guide, encourage, and comfort his students during their ordeals, to remind them to be cautious in the face of their enemies and above all to maintain their solidarity and to strengthen their brotherly relations.

Signs of Miraculousness (İşârât-ül İ'caz)
This book is a very concise commentary on (i) Surah al•Fatiha- The aims of the Qur'an; Peace); About Paradise; About Life, Death and the Resurrection of the Dead; The teaching of the Names. Its aim is to expound the Miraculous nature of the Qur'an's word order.
For "the embroideries" of the positioning and arrangement of the Qur'an's words demonstrate one aspect of its Miraculousness. Nursî was intent on demonstrating the conformity of the Qur'an with reason and the modern physical sciences. In this way, he replied both to questions and doubts that arose in the face of scientific advances, and to demonstrate that, as the revealed Word of Allah, the Qur'an has ever continuing relevance in contemporary life. Thus, though composed in the early period of Said Nursi's life, under trying conditions in 1913-14, this book contains in concise form, the ideas and truths that he subsequently elaborated in the Risale-i Nur, and in many respects is of the greatest interest and importance for the people of modernity.
The Qur'an is the pre-eternal translator of the mighty book of the universe; the post-eternal interpreter of the various tongues reciting the verses of creation; the commentator of the book of the Worlds of the Seen and the Unseen; the revealer of the treasuries of the Divine Names hidden in the heavens and on the earth; the key to the truths concealed beneath the lines of events; the tongue of the Unseen World in the Manifest World; the treasury of the post-eternal favors of the Most Merciful and of the pre-eternal Addresses of that Most Holy One, that come from the World of the Unseen beyond the veil of this Manifest World; it is the sun, foundation, and plan of the spiritual world of Islam; the sacred map of the worlds of the Hereafter. Nursî articulates most succinctly that many verses of the Qur'an that have been questioned in fact contain flashes of Miraculousness and numerous subtle points.

The Staff of Moses (Asa-yı Musa)
This book consists of three parts in its original. Part One comprises 'The Fruits of Belief that discusses numerous aspects- One hour per day is sufficient for the five obligatory prayers; Death is a source of anxiety for man; true, pain-free pleasure is found only in belief in Allah, and is possible only through such Belief; The necessity of spending one's youth chastely and on the straight path; The sciences make known the Glorious Creator of the universe with His Names, Attributes and perfections; The truths and proofs about the existence of the Hereafter from Our Sustainer, our Prophet Muhammad (Upon Whom be Blessings and Peace), the other Prophets and earlier Scriptures, the Qur'an, the angels and then the universe.; There are a number of benefits of Believing in the Hereafter that look to man's individual and social life; It is impossible to separate the pillars of Belief as each proves all of them, requires them, and necessitates them; A Flower of Emirdag - An extremely powerful reply to objections raised about repetitions in the Qur'an; The fruits tasted in this world of belief in the angels
Part Two comprises 'A Decisive Proof of Allah' and consists of eleven proofs of the truths of Iman. In the words of Nursî: "just as the staff of Prophet Musa (Upon whom Be Peace) caused twelve springs to gush forth and was the means of eleven miracles, so the present collection (The Staff of Moses) consists of the eleven light-scattering topics of 'The Fruits of Belief', and the eleven certain proofs of 'The Decisive Proof of Allah' " thus, this book receives its name The Staff of Moses, and is a source of life-giving waters for the strengthening of one's faith.

The Epitomes of Light (Mesnevî-i Nuriye)
Reasonings (Muhâkemât)

Booklets
The Damascus Sermon (Hutbe-i Şâmiye)
Fruits of Belief (Meyve Risalesi)
A Guide for Youth (Gençlik Rehberi)
The Islamic Unity (İttihad-ı İslam)

Others (not translated)
The Barla Letters (Barla Lahikası)
The Kastamonu Letters (Kastamonu Lahikası)
The Emirdağ Letters (Emirdağ Lahikası)
Sikke-i Tasdik-i Gaybî
Âsâr-ı Bedîiyye
İman ve Küfür Muvâzeneleri
Münâzarat
Nur Çeşmesi
Sünûhât - Tulûât - İşârât
Nur Âleminin Bir Anahtarı
Dîvan-ı Harb-i Örfî
Nurun İlk Kapısı
Hizmet Rehberi
Fihrist

See also 
 Said Nursi
 Nur Movement

References

 Nursi, Said (2004), "The Letters", trans. By Sukran Vahide,  Sozler Nesriyat, Istanbul

External links
 Risale-i Nur Collection in 52 Languages
 https://www.yeniasya.com.tr/Sites/YeniAsya/Upload/files/Docs/Bediuzzaman-Said-Nursi.pdf
 NurNetwork.org International nur network
 Risale-i Nur Collection in English
 Durham University Risale-i Nur Studies Downloadable English pdf files for two different translations
 Zahra Institute
 downloadable .pdf and .doc files of the collection hosted at the Lighthouse for Humanity website.

Sunni tafsir